Carlo Ubbiali (22 September 19292 June 2020) was an Italian nine-time World Champion motorcycle road racer. In the 1950s, he was a dominant force in the smaller classes of Grand Prix motorcycle racing, winning six 125cc and three 250cc world titles.

Career
Ubbiali was born in Bergamo, Lombardy. In 1949, the first year of Grand Prix motorcycle racing, he finished in fourth place in the 125cc class riding an MV Agusta. That year, he also won a gold medal in the International Six Days Trial. He switched to Mondial for the 1950 season, and the following year won his first world championship for Mondial in 1951.

After losing his crown to Cecil Sandford in 1952, he re-signed with MV Agusta. He went on to become their top rider, winning six 125cc titles and three 250cc crowns and scoring double championships in 1956, 1959, and 1960. Ubbiali was also a five-time winner at the prestigious Isle of Man TT races. He rarely made a mistake while competing, as evidenced by the fact that he never suffered a serious crash during his 12-year Grand Prix career.

Ubbiali retired at the age of 30 while still in his prime. Until the motorcycle racing career of Giacomo Agostini, he was considered Italy's greatest motorcycle racer. His nine World Championships tie him with Mike Hailwood and Valentino Rossi for third place on the championship win list behind only Giacomo Agostini and Ángel Nieto. In 2001, the F.I.M. inducted Ubbiali into the MotoGP Hall of Fame. In 2019, Ubbiali received the Coni Golden Collar award.

Ubbiali died on 2 June 2020. By the time of his death, he was the last surviving rider from the first season of Grand Prix motorcycle racing.

Motorcycle Grand Prix results 
1949 points system:

Points system from 1950 to 1968:

(key) (Races in italics indicate fastest lap)

References

External links 
 Carlo Ubbiali profile at iomtt.com

Italian motorcycle racers
250cc World Championship riders
125cc World Championship riders
Isle of Man TT riders
Sportspeople from Bergamo
1929 births
2020 deaths
250cc World Riders' Champions
125cc World Riders' Champions